The Minister of Basic Education is a Minister in the Cabinet of South Africa, with the responsibility of overseeing the Department of Basic Education, which is responsible for primary and secondary education. Before 10 May 2009 the portfolio formed part of the Ministry of Education, with responsibility for both basic education and higher education, the latter now being the responsibility of the Minister of Higher Education and Training.

Ministers with responsibility for Basic Education

References

External links
Ministry of Education
Department of Basic Education

South Africa
 
Education
Lists of political office-holders in South Africa